The 1967 NCAA University Division Golf Championship was the 29th annual NCAA-sanctioned golf tournament to determine the individual and team national champions of men's collegiate golf in the United States.

The tournament was held at the Shawnee Golf Course in Shawnee on Delaware, Pennsylvania.

Three-time defending champions Houston won the team title, the Cougars' tenth NCAA team national title.

Individual results

Individual champion
 Hale Irwin, Colorado

Team results

Note: Top 10 only
DC = Defending champions

References

NCAA Men's Golf Championship
Golf in Pennsylvania
NCAA Golf Championship
NCAA Golf Championship
NCAA Golf Championship